Thank You is the fifth studio album by Royal Trux. It was released in 1995.

Track listing

References

External links
 

1995 albums
Royal Trux albums
Albums produced by David Briggs (producer)
Virgin Records albums
Charisma Records albums
Drag City (record label) albums